Michelle Schuller (born 1947) is a French writer, laureate of the 1991 Prix des libraires.

Works 
1990: Une femme qui ne disait rien, Presses de la Renaissance,  - Prix des libraires the following year
1992: La Nuit sauvage Le Livre de Poche, 
1993: Ciel bleu, terre noire, Éditions Belfond,  
1996: Transgression, livre d’artiste, linogravures by Sotiris Barounas, texts by Michelle Schuller, preface by Gérard Georges Lemaire, Éditions Éric Koehler
2005: Soi et les autres : étude des relations familiales dans les écrits privés florentins des XIVe-XVe siècles, thèse de doctorat de POIDEVIN SCHULLER Michell,

External links 
 Michelle Schuller on Babelio
 Le prix des Libraires à Michelle Schuller on Les Échos (16 May 1991)

21st-century French non-fiction writers
Prix des libraires winners
1947 births
Living people
21st-century French women writers